Polur M. Varadhan (25 February 1952 – 27 January 2011) was an Indian politician and Member of the Legislative Assembly of Tamil Nadu. He was elected to the Tamil Nadu legislative assembly from Chengam constituency as an Indian National Congress candidate in 2001, and 2006 elections and from Sriperumbudur constituency in 1991 election.

Personal life 
Varadhan was born in Keezhkarikkathur village in Polur Taluk in Tiruvannamalai district in Tamil Nadu on 25 February 1952. He died in Chennai on 27 January 2011 due to an unreported liver illness. He is survived by his wife Prema and a son named Rajiv.

References 

1951 births
2011 deaths
Indian National Congress politicians from Tamil Nadu
People from Tiruvannamalai district
Tamil Nadu MLAs 1991–1996
Tamil Nadu MLAs 2001–2006
Tamil Nadu MLAs 2006–2011